Clint Bowles (born November 16, 1988) is an American former professional tennis player.

A left-handed player from Tampa, Bowles won the USTA national clay-court championships for both the 14s and 18s age groups. He was ranked as high as 28th in the world on the ITF junior circuit.

Bowles competed as a wildcard in the main draw of an ATP Tour tournament at Delray Beach in 2008, losing in the first round to Paul Capdeville. His other professional appearances were on the ITF Futures circuit.

From 2008 to 2011 he played collegiate tennis for Florida State University, where he twice received All-ACC honors.

References

External links
 
 

1988 births
Living people
American male tennis players
Florida State Seminoles men's tennis players
Tennis players from Tampa, Florida